Under the Piano is a 1995 television film directed by Stefan Scaini and features Kevin Sullivan as executive producer. The film follows the story of one woman’s overwhelming faith in her talented but emotionally defenceless sister. The film starred Megan Follows and Amanda Plummer as the sisters and opera singer Teresa Stratas as their mother. Stratas won a Gemini Award as best supporting actress for her performance.

The film is loosely based on the life experiences of Dolly and Henrietta Giardini. Sullivan had seen their story on an episode of 20/20 and was moved by the potential of it. Henrietta was born an autistic savant; though her mental/emotional faculties have never fully developed, she possesses an extraordinary gift for memorization and for music. The two sisters lives were crucial to each other's survival as Dolly was handicapped, born with a paralyzed arm.

Synopsis
The film is set in the 1940s and 1950s. Franny Basilio is determined to help her musically gifted autistic sister Rosetta have a life of her own. Their mother Regina, who gave up a promising career as an opera singer to raise her children, refuses to acknowledge Rosetta’s talent and believes she will never be capable of looking after herself. Franny vehemently disagrees with her mother, which has caused friction between them since she was a child. Eventually, Regina’s bitterness, ignorance and desire for acknowledgement of her own talent cause a rift between her and her daughters. Franny ultimately moves out of the house causing Rosetta to hurt herself in a desperate cry for help. Rosetta is hospitalized and assessed by doctors who recommend to Regina that her daughter be lobotomized for her own good. Franny must summon all of her courage in order to prevent her mother from allowing Rosetta to have the operation and be committed to an institution for the rest of her life.

Cast
 Amanda Plummer – Franny Basilio
 Megan Follows – Rosetta Basilio
 Teresa Stratas – Regina Basilio
 James Carroll – Nick
 John Juliani – Frank
 Jackie Richardson – Mrs. Syms
 Richard Blackburn – Dr. Banman
 Dan Lett – Dr. Harkness
 Judith Orban – Hazel
 Andrew Tarbet – Orderly
 Deborah Grover – Nurse Thompson
 Richard McMillan – Dr. Davison
 Tara Macri – Michelle
 Louisa Martin – Michelle's mother
 Simone Rosenberg – Young Violet
 Andrew Sardella – Tommy 13
 Anita LaSelva – Juliet 24
 Mary Kelly – Mrs. Simpson
 Benjamin Plener – Boy
 Vince Marino – Store owner
 Marie-Hélène Fontaine – Nurse
 François Klanfer – Priest 1955
 Costin Manu – Peddlar
 Colin O'Meara – Rick
 Susan Tsagkaris – Leonora
 Fran Vallee – Mme Benoit
 Nicky Guadagni – Miss Evans
 Mari Trainor – Marge
 Chris Benson – Bill

List of awards
 Cable Ace Nomination – Best International Dramatic Special or Series/Movie or Miniseries, 1996
 3 Gemini Awards – Best Costume Design, Best Supporting Actress in a TV Movie (Teresa Stratas), Best Sound, 1996
2 Gemini Nominations – Best TV Movie, Best Direction in a Dramatic Program (Stefan Scaini), 1996

References

External links

Sullivan Entertainment – official Under the Piano page

1995 television films
1995 films
Films about autism
Canadian drama television films
English-language Canadian films
1990s Canadian films